Limehouse is an unincorporated community in Jasper County, South Carolina, United States.

References

Unincorporated communities in Jasper County, South Carolina
Unincorporated communities in South Carolina